Immanuel School is significant for its association with the area's parochial education of African-American children in the Aiken, South Carolina, (USA), area from 1890 to 1932. It was listed on the National Register of Historic Places in 2009.

Enrollment

Peak enrollment reached 300 in 1906.

Uses

Since 1932, the historic building has been used for many different purposes. It currently houses the Center for African American History, Art and Culture and is open to the public for events and tours by appointment.

External Links
  Center for African American History, Art and Culture

References

African-American history of South Carolina
School buildings on the National Register of Historic Places in South Carolina
Victorian architecture in South Carolina
Buildings and structures in Aiken, South Carolina
National Register of Historic Places in Aiken County, South Carolina